Colonel Sir Malcolm Stoddart-Scott OBE MC TD (23 September 1901 Pontefract– 15 June 1973) was a Conservative Party politician in the United Kingdom.

He attended Elmfield College and was then a master there. He qualified as a doctor from the University of Leeds and was commissioned Lieutenant in the Territorial Army Royal Army Medical Corps in 1927, eventually reaching the rank of colonel.

He was Member of Parliament (MP) for Pudsey and Otley from 1945 to 1950, and after that constituency was abolished in boundary changes for the 1950 general election, he was MP for Ripon from 1950 until his death in 1973.

He served as chairman, British group of the Inter-Parliamentary Union, 1951–59 and as a member of the Church Assembly. Farmer and director of family wool business, B Parkinson & Co.

The by-election following his death was won by the Liberal Party candidate, David Austick.

References

External links 
 

1901 births
1973 deaths
People educated at Ashville College
Royal Army Medical Corps officers
20th-century English medical doctors
Officers of the Order of the British Empire
Recipients of the Military Cross
Knights Bachelor
Politicians awarded knighthoods
Conservative Party (UK) MPs for English constituencies
UK MPs 1945–1950
UK MPs 1950–1951
UK MPs 1951–1955
UK MPs 1955–1959
UK MPs 1959–1964
UK MPs 1964–1966
UK MPs 1966–1970
UK MPs 1970–1974